Clarges Street is a street in the City of Westminster, London. The street runs from Clarges Mews in the north to Piccadilly in the south. It is crossed by Curzon Street.

History

Clarges Street was built in the early 18th century and is probably named after Sir Thomas Clarges.

Notable inhabitants
Notable inhabitants of Clarges Street have included Lady Hamilton, Edmund Kean, Thomas Babington Macaulay, and racing driver D'Arcy Baker.

Buildings
Clarges Street is mostly made up of Georgian town houses and modern office buildings. The headquarters of The Kennel Club is at numbers 1–5.

References

External links 

Desolation Island by Patrick O'Brian, Harper Collins 2003 ed., @ p. 102.

Streets in the City of Westminster